Taizong is the temple name used for several monarchs of China. It may refer to:

 Tai Jia ( 16th-century BC), king of the Shang dynasty
 Liu Heng (202 BC–157 BC, reigned 180 BC–157 BC), also known as Emperor Wen, Han dynasty emperor
 Shi Koumi (石寇覓;  295), Shi Hu's father, posthumously honored as Taizong of Later Zhao
 Li Xiong (274–334, reigned 304–334), also known as Emperor Wu, emperor of Cheng Han
 Zhang Mao (277–324, reigned 320–324), ruler of Former Liang
 Sima Yu (320–372, reigned in 372), also known as Emperor Jianwen, emperor of the Jin dynasty (266–420)
 Fu Deng (343–394, reigned 386–394), also known as Emperor Gao, Former Qin emperor
 Tuoba Si (392–423, reigned 409–423), also known as Emperor Mingyuan, Northern Wei emperor
 Liu Yu (439–472, reigned 465–472), also known as Emperor Ming, emperor of Liu Song
 Xiao Gang (503–551, reigned 549–551), also known as Emperor Jianwen, Liang dynasty emperor
 Li Shimin (599–649, reigned 626–649), Tang dynasty emperor
 Yelü Deguang (902–947, reigned 926–947), emperor of Khitan (renamed Liao dynasty during his reign)
 Wang Yanjun (died 935, reigned 927–935), also known as Emperor Huizong, Min dynasty emperor
 Duan Siliang (died 951, reigned 945–951), emperor of the Dali Kingdom
 Zhao Guangyi (939–997, reigned 976–997), Song dynasty emperor
 Li Deming (981–1032, reigned 1004–1032), leader of Tangut people, later posthumously honored as emperor of Western Xia
 Wanyan Sheng (1075–1135, reigned 1123–1135), emperor of the Jin dynasty (1115–1234)
 Ögedei Khan (died 1241, reigned 1229–1241), Yuan dynasty emperor
 Zhu Di (1360–1424, reigned 1402–1424), also known as Yongle Emperor and Emperor Chengzu, Ming dynasty emperor
 Taisun Khan (1416–1452, reigned 1433–1452), khagan of the Northern Yuan
 Hong Taiji (1592–1643, reigned 1626–1643), originally khan of Later Jin, later became emperor of Qing dynasty

See also 
 Taejong (1367–1422), Korean equivalent
 Thái Tông (disambiguation), Vietnamese equivalent
 Taizu (disambiguation)
 Daizong (disambiguation)

Temple name disambiguation pages